James Wilson may refer to:

Politicians and government officials

Canada 
James Wilson (Upper Canada politician) (1770–1847), English-born farmer and political figure in Upper Canada
James Crocket Wilson (1841–1899), Canadian MP from Quebec
James Robert Wilson (1866–1941), mayor of Saskatoon and member of the Parliament of Canada
James Wilson (Ontario MPP) (1810–1891), Canadian politician

Oceania 
James Wilson (New South Wales politician, born 1862) (1862–1925), English-born Australian politician
James Wilson (New South Wales politician, born 1865) (1865–1927), New Zealand-born Australian politician
Sir James Wilson (New Zealand politician, born 1849) (1849–1929), New Zealand politician and farmer
James Wilson (New Zealand politician, born 1814) (1814–1898)
Sir James Milne Wilson (1812–1880), Australian politician in Tasmania
James Phillips Wilson (c. 1852–1925), South Australian Labor politician

United Kingdom 
James Wilson (MP for York) between 1826 and 1830.
James Wilson (Labour politician) (1879–1943), British MP for Dudley and Oldham
James Harold Wilson (1916–1995), Prime Minister of the United Kingdom, 1964–1970 and 1974–1976
James Wilson (businessman) (1805–1860), UK member of parliament and founder of The Economist magazine
James Wilson (Orangeman) (fl. 1793–94), North Irish politician, founder of the Orange Institution

United States 
James Wilson (Founding Father) (1742–1798), Founding Father of the United States
James Wilson (Colorado politician), former member of the Colorado House of Representatives
James Wilson (Indiana politician) (1825–1867), US Representative
James Wilson I (New Hampshire politician) (1766–1839), US Representative
James Wilson II (1797–1881), US Representative, son of James Wilson I
James Wilson (Pennsylvania politician) (1779–1868), US Representative
James Wilson (Secretary of Agriculture) (1835–1920), United States Secretary of Agriculture and US Representative from Iowa
James Charles Wilson (1816–1861), American politician in Texas
James Clifton Wilson (1874–1951), US Representative from Texas
James F. Wilson (1828–1895), US Senator and Representative from Iowa
James J. Wilson (1775–1824), US Senator from New Jersey
James M. Wilson Jr. (1918–2009), Assistant Secretary of State
James Wilson (journalist) (1787–1850), Irish-American journalist, politician, and judge

Military and revolutionary figures
James Wilson (British Army officer) (1921–2004), British general
James Wilson (explorer) (1760–1814), brought the first British missionaries to Tahiti
James Wilson (Irish nationalist) (1836–1921), Irish republican convicted of desertion
James Wilson (revolutionary) (1760–1820), Scottish leader of the Radical War
James H. Wilson (1837–1925), general in the United States Army

Sportsmen
James Wilson (athlete) (1891–1973), British athlete
James Wilson (Australian rules footballer) (c. 1855–1935), Australian rules footballer for Geelong
James Wilson (basketball), American basketball player
James Wilson (cricketer) (born 1978), South African cricketer
James Wilson (darts player) (born 1972), English darts player
James Wilson (footballer, born 1866) (c. 1866–1900), Scottish footballer
James Wilson (footballer, born 1882), Scottish footballer (St Mirren, Preston NE)
James Wilson (footballer, born 1884) (1884–1934), Australian rules footballer for Essendon
James Wilson (footballer, born 1890) (1890–1917), Scottish footballer (Queen's Park)
James Wilson (Welsh footballer) (born 1989), Welsh professional footballer with Plymouth Argyle
James Wilson (English footballer) (born 1995), English professional footballer for Port Vale
James Wilson (1910s footballer), English footballer
James Wilson (rugby union) (born 1983), New Zealand rugby player
James Wilson (trainer) (1828–1917), founder of St. Albans Stud, Victoria, Australia
James B. Wilson (1896–1986), American football player and coach
James H. Wilson (American football) (1940–2013), American football coach

Science and medicine
James Wilson (anatomist) (1765–1821), Scottish anatomist
James Wilson (scientist), American gene therapist
James Wilson (zoologist) (1795–1856), Scottish zoologist
James Wilson (mathematician) (1774?–1829), Irish mathematician
James A. Wilson (21st century), American mathematician
James Arthur Wilson (1795–1882), English physician
James G. Wilson (1915–1987), embryologist and anatomist
James George Wilson (1830–1881), Scottish surgeon and professor of midwifery
James Ricker Wilson (1922–2007), American theoretical physicist
James Thomas Wilson (1861–1945), British professor of anatomy

Arts and craftspersons
James Wilson (architect) (1816–1900), British architect in Bath
James Wilson (cinematographer) (active 1927–1963), British cinematographer
James Wilson (composer) (1922–2005), Irish composer
James Wilson (globe maker) (1763–1855), American globe maker
James Wilson (songwriter), 18th-century English songwriter
James Daniel Wilson (born 1977), English actor
James Keys Wilson (1828–1894), American architect in Ohio
Mark Wilson (magician) or James Wilson (1929–2021), American magician
James Perry Wilson (1889–1976), American painter, designer, and architect

Academics
James Kinnier Wilson (1921–2022), British assyriologist
James Q. Wilson (1931–2012), American professor of public policy
James Southall Wilson (1880–1963), American author, professor, and founder of the Virginia Quarterly Review

Clergy
James Wilson (Archdeacon of Manchester) (1836–1931), British theologian and science teacher
James Wilson (bishop) (died 1857), Irish bishop of Cork
James Wilson (Dean of Elphin and Ardagh), Irish Anglican clergyman
James Wilson (Dean of Tuam), Irish Anglican clergyman
James Hood Wilson (1829–1903), moderator of the General Assembly of the Free Church of Scotland in 1895

Other
James Wilson (civil servant) (1853–1926), British civil servant in British India
James Wilson (unionist) (1876–1945), American labor union leader
James Wilson (House), a character on House
James Grant Wilson (1832–1914), American soldier, editor, and author
James Wilson (motorcyclist) (c. 1901–1995), long-distance motorcyclist and author
James William Wilson, Jr. (born 1969), American murderer and perpetrator of the Oakland Elementary School shooting

See also
Jim Wilson (disambiguation)